Alan F. Estevez is an American government official who is currently serving as under secretary of commerce for industry and security in the Biden administration.

Education 
Estevez earned a Bachelor of Arts degree in political science from Rutgers University and a Master of Science in national resource strategy from the Industrial College of the Armed Forces.

Career 
From 1981 to 2002, Estevez served in the Office of the Secretary of Defense, the United States Department of the Army, and the Military Surface Deployment and Distribution Command. During the Obama administration, Estevez served in the United States Department of Defense as Assistant Secretary of Defense for Logistics and Materiel Readiness and principal deputy under secretary of defense (acquisition, technology & logistics). After the end of the Obama administration, Estevez joined Deloitte as a national security and logistics consultant. In July 2021, President Joe Biden nominated Estevez to serve as under secretary of commerce for industry and security. He was confirmed to the position by the United States Senate on March 31, 2022, and sworn in on April 19.

References 

Living people
Year of birth missing (living people)
Rutgers University alumni
Dwight D. Eisenhower School for National Security and Resource Strategy alumni
National Defense University alumni
United States Department of Defense officials
Biden administration personnel